Spencer Nicholas Roditi (born August 1945) is a British hedge fund manager for George Soros, turned real estate developer. He grew up in Rhodesia Zimbabwe (now Zimbabwe).

Early life
Spencer Nicholas Roditi was born in August 1945. He was educated at Peterhouse Boys' School, an independent boarding school on the outskirts of Marondera, in Zimbabwe. He graduated in 1963.

Career
Roditi was George Soros's  "most trusted advisor" for some years and ran his Quota Fund and Quasar International, for which he was paid £80 million in 2006.

In April 2015, the Sunday Times estimated his net worth at £1.0 billion

According to The Sunday Times Rich List in 2020, Roditi is worth £2 billion, an increase of £333 million from 2019.

Roditi is a non-executive director of PGI Group.

Personal life
In 1997 he married his wife Pamela, has a son James and lives in a Georgian house in Hampstead, London. He has an estate in South Africa, about 40 miles from Cape Town.

References

1945 births
Living people
Alumni of Peterhouse Boys' School
British billionaires
British hedge fund managers